Aleem Said Ahmad Basher (  born August 3, 1951) is a Filipino Muslim Alim, an active Islamic preacher, broadcaster, lecturer and Islamic consultant. He is the current Chairman of the Imam Council of the Philippines. A Muslim leader and Imam, who tends to the community development, social needs, and spiritual guidance of Filipino Muslims, specifically those living in the Islamic communities in Metro Manila and nearby provinces in Luzon.

Because of his sincerity to serve well the Filipino Muslims, his chairmanship in IMAM - Integrated Movement Access on Moonsighting, an organization that discusses the moon sighting issues among Muslims in the country during the months of Ramadan and Dhu al-Hijjah for the respective rituals and Islamic traditions; inspired him to apply membership in a reputed international moonsighting group the Moonsighting Committee Worldwide - MCW.

Aleem Said is known to be grateful and deferent even to dissimilar in faith. His active participation on various groups nationwide made him recognized in many organizations. He was quoted saying that the "ulama conference would resolve the problem of disunity among the ranks of the ulama" during the recent first National Ulama Consultative Conference; which was held in Cebu organized by the National Commission on Muslim Filipinos. He was also one of the 32 of the country’s top Islamic clerics (ulamas) who support the administration of President Benigno S. Aquino III’s peace processes with Muslim rebel organizations.

Personal life and education
In 1951, Aleem Said was born in Makkah, to Sheikh Ahmad and Zinab of the Maranao ethnic group. He was the second child and son among five children of Sheikh Ahmad with his first wife. Because of his passion for the Islamic way of life, like his father, Aleem Said decided to pursue a bachelor's degree in Islamic Propagation at Al-Azhar University in Cairo, Egypt which he graduated in 1994. He also has master's degree in business administration and a bachelor's degree in commerce, both completed at the Manuel L. Quezon University (MBA-1983 & B.Sc.-1975) respectively.

Aleem Said is married to Saidah Sambarani, from a prominent family in Tamparan, Lanao del Sur.

Studentry and leadership

During his stay at Al-Azhar University, Aleem Said was intensively immersed to great responsibilities when he was nominated and was elected by his fellow students, as founding President to the Federation of Foreign Students' Association, in Cairo, Egypt in the year 1996 - 1998. Being the former President of the Philippines Students' Association in Cairo, Cairo, Egypt from 1995–1996; made him an effective leader in heading the federation in two years successively. Because of his intense exposure to being a cause oriented and a discipline leader, Aleem Said was inducted to KBP, a prestigious association of broadcasters in the Philippines in 2006. In 2004, he was elected as member to the Board of Directors at the Agama Islam Society, up-to-present.

Social and missionary

Islamic viewpoint
Aleem Said adheres to the Sunni branch of Islam. He is an anti-abortion and a peace advocate. He denounces terrorism, and describes violence in every form as "un-Islamic" that a real and true Muslim does not hurt innocent people.

Interfaith dialogue
In 2005, a group of Maranao entrepreneurs living in Manila elected Aleem Said as Vice-President of the Manila Muslim Chamber of Commerce, though, he is not involved in any such businesses. In 2010, Aleem Said, being a peace advocator for more than a decade, has successfully convened the Philippines Interfaith Leaders Forum; an innovative step he perceived as an interfaith initiative expert, during his tenure as member of the board of directors at Peacemakers' Circle Foundation. The Peacemakers’ Circle was founded in July 1998 by Marites Guingona-Africa, niece of former Vice-President Teofisto Guingona. He is actively involved in interfaith dialogue, whether in private or public sector. He's quoted saying “our collective prayers are the best thing that we can do as a nation to bolster the diplomatic efforts and representation of our government before the Government of China to save the lives of the three Filipinos,” as a response to the President's appeal during the wake of the conviction of jailed workers.

Aleem Said also served as spiritual consultant during the recent National Forum on Zakat held at the SMX Convention Center. Paying zakat is one of Five Pillars of Islam. He explains that Quran has named the eight kinds of persons who should receive zakah, such as the Masako (destitute); fuqaraa (the needy or poor); amil' Zakah (the alms collectors); VI sabi `Tillah (in the path of God); gharimun (people burdened with debt); ibn as-Sabi l (the wayfarers); Riyadh (people in bondage or slavery); and mu'Allaf (those who have inclined towards Islam). He also gives spiritual guidance on every before, during, and after of the two Eids. In Ramadan, he cited the importance of adhering to the Sunnah of Islam's prophet. He also emphasized that Eid’l Fitr was also a day for visiting relatives and friends and for making reconciliation. In Dhu al-Hijjah, Aleem Said explained that Eid al-Adha symbolizes to the obedience of Prophet Ibrahim and his son Ismail as commanded by Allah, it represents the prayer for peace not only among Muslims but in unity and love of mankind that worship God. The eid means festival and adha means sacrifice.

Achievements and awards

Aleem Said has attended numerous activities which were hosted either by a governmental and NGO such as: conference, workshop, seminar, symposium, course, training, forum, meetings etc. in international, national and local levels. These agencies include but not limited to Muslim World League, DepEd-ARMM, World Federation of International Arab-Islamic Schools, Department Of Health–ARMM, International Islamic Federation of Student Organizations (IIFSO) and Islamic Universities League. (I.U.L.)

He also received plaques, certificates etc. both from government and NGO for his achievements, contribution to the community development and humanitarian activities.

TV Appearance

Website
https://web.archive.org/web/20180806113133/http://iamasab.com/

See also
 Sheikh Ahmad Bashir, founder of Jamiatu Muslim Mindanao

References

External links
 
 Imam Council of the Philippines, Inc.
 Moonsighting Committee Worldwide
 The Peacemakers' Circle Foundation Inc.
 Directory of Experts/Resource Persons - Islam the Religion

1951 births
Filipino broadcasters
Filipino Sunni Muslim scholars of Islam
20th-century imams
Living people
Manuel L. Quezon University alumni
Al-Azhar University alumni
Filipino expatriates in Saudi Arabia
Filipino Muslims
Filipino expatriates in Egypt